Trimix may refer to:

 Trimix (breathing gas), a gas mixture used in deep-sea diving
 Trimix (injection), an injection used to treat erectile dysfunction